Scaliger is a prominent lunar impact crater in the southern hemisphere on the far side of the Moon. It is attached to the northwest rim of the walled plain Milne, and the shared perimeter has reshaped the outer wall of Scaliger slightly, producing a straightened section along the southeast. To the west of Scaliger is the Lacus Solitudinis.

The outer wall of Scaliger is somewhat polygonal in shape, especially in the southern half. The rim has not been heavily eroded by subsequent impacts, in contrast to the heavily worn Milne to the southeast. The inner wall of Scaliger's rim displays terraces, and a notable outer rampart overlaying the floor of Milne. The interior floor of Scaliger is relatively flat, with a rough surface near the inner wall. Near the midpoint is a central peak, offset slightly to the east.

Satellite craters
By convention these features are identified on lunar maps by placing the letter on the side of the crater midpoint that is closest to Scaliger.

References

 
 
 
 
 
 
 
 
 
 
 
 

Impact craters on the Moon